The enzyme tagatose-bisphosphate aldolase catalyzes the chemical reaction

D-tagatose 1,6-bisphosphate  glycerone phosphate + Dglyceraldehyde 3-phosphate

This enzyme belongs to the family of lyases, specifically the aldehyde-lyases, which cleave carbon-carbon bonds.  The systematic name of this enzyme class is D-tagatose 1,6-bisphosphate D-glyceraldehyde-3-phosphate-lyase (glycerone-phosphate-forming). This enzyme is also called D-tagatose-1,6-bisphosphate triosephosphate lyase.  This enzyme participates in galactose metabolism.

Structural studies

As of late 2007, only one structure has been solved for this class of enzymes, with the PDB accession code .

References

 
 

EC 4.1.2
Enzymes of known structure